Eduardo Uribe (born 11 March 1970) is a Mexican cyclist. He competed in the men's individual road race at the 1996 Summer Olympics.

References

External links
 

1970 births
Living people
Mexican male cyclists
Olympic cyclists of Mexico
Cyclists at the 1996 Summer Olympics
Place of birth missing (living people)
21st-century Mexican people
20th-century Mexican people